Anigozanthos pulcherrimus or yellow kangaroo paw is a grass-like perennial herb that is native to Western Australia; from Perth to Geraldton. Anigozanthos pulcherrimus has yellow flowers that appear from October to December.

References

pulcherrimus
Commelinales of Australia
Angiosperms of Western Australia